Bahius is a genus of frog in the family Strabomantidae. It contains a single species, Bahius bilineatus.

It was long classified in the genus Eleutherodactylus in the family Eleuthrodactylidae, until later studies found it to form a clade with Noblella and Barycholos within subfamily Holoadeninae. Due to this, it was reclassified to the monotypic genus Bahius.

It is endemic to the Bahia state in eastern Brazil.
Its natural habitat is lowland moist forest, but it also occurs in cocoa plantations. With trees around, it accepts habitat alteration. It has been found in leaf litter and in bromeliads. It can be threatened by habitat loss.

References

Strabomantidae
Endemic fauna of Brazil
Amphibians of Brazil
Amphibians described in 1975
Taxonomy articles created by Polbot
Monotypic amphibian genera
Taxobox binomials not recognized by IUCN